Holly Rushmeier is an American computer scientist and is the John C. Malone Professor of Computer Science at Yale University. She is known for her contributions to the field of computer graphics.

Biography

Rushmeier has received three degrees in mechanical engineering from Cornell University: the B.S. in 1977, the M.S. in 1986, and the Ph.D. in 1988. Before returning to graduate school in 1983, she worked in Seattle as an engineer at Boeing Commercial Airplanes and Washington Natural Gas.

While at Cornell, Rushmeier collaborated with Kenneth Torrance and Donald P. Greenberg. After obtaining her Ph.D., Rushmeier joined the mechanical engineering faculty as an assistant professor at Georgia Tech, where she taught courses on heat transfer and numerical methods and conducted research on computer graphics image synthesis. She left in 1991 to join the National Institute of Standards and Technology, where she focused on scientific data visualization. She continued to investigate problems in data visualization as a staff member at the IBM Thomas J. Watson Research Center from 1996 to 2004. She then assumed her current position as professor of computer science at Yale University, where she served as chair of the department from 2011 to 2014. With Julie Dorsey, she leads the computer graphics laboratory at Yale.

Work
Rushmeier is particularly interested in scanning and modeling shape and appearance, as well as the applications of computer graphics in cultural heritage. At IBM, she worked on the project to create a 3D model of Michelangelo's Florence Pietà, as well as the Eternal Egypt collaboration between IBM and the government of Egypt to build a digital showcase of the country's cultural artifacts.

Rushmeier is also noted for her work on global illumination, material capture, and the display of high-dynamic-range images. Her contributions to the field of computer graphics include the development of methods for solving for illumination in the presence of participating media (i.e. environments such as fog and murky water that affect the light passing through them) and the extension of the radiosity method to handle specular BRDFs.

She has served in numerous editorial and technical capacities, including editor-in-chief of ACM Transactions on Graphics from 1996 to 1999, editor of IEEE Transactions on Visualization and Computer Graphics from 1996 to 1998, and co-editor-in-chief of Computer Graphics Forum from 2010 to 2014. She was chair of the papers committee for ACM SIGGRAPH in 1996 and co-chair of the IEEE Visualization papers committee in 1998, 2004, and 2005. She is an ACM Distinguished Engineer, a 2016 Fellow of the ACM, a 2011 Fellow of the Eurographics Association, and the recipient of the 2013 ACM SIGGRAPH Computer Graphics Achievement Award.

In 2022, Rushmeier joined a research team involving computer scientists, archaeologists, and historians, the projects aim is to research the ancient city of Dura-Europos. The project received a $350,000 grant from the National Endowment for Humanities in order to develop a digital archive of materials related to Dura-Europos. Rushmeier is involved with creating a virtual cloud to host this data and create a user interface that allows researchers to access data and add new information.

Selected publications

References

External links
 Rushmeier's home page at the Yale Computer Graphics Laboratory
 Rushmeier's biography on the Eurographics website
 Rushmeier's profile in the Connecticut Academy of Science and Engineering
 Rushmeier's profile at ACM

Living people
American computer scientists
American women computer scientists
Computer graphics researchers
Cornell University alumni
Yale University faculty
Year of birth missing (living people)
Fellows of the Association for Computing Machinery
American women academics
21st-century American women
Ithaca High School (Ithaca, New York) alumni